Paphiopedilum fairrieanum is a species of orchid occurring from the eastern Himalaya to Assam.

External links

fairrieanum